Turok: Evolution is a first-person shooter video game released for the PlayStation 2, Xbox and GameCube in 2002. A port for Microsoft Windows was released in 2003 for the European market. It is a prequel to Turok: Dinosaur Hunter and was the last to follow in the series before it was rebooted by a 2008 entry in the series, called Turok.

Plot
The game begins with the seer, Tarkeen, explaining the history of the Lost Lands which had, for years, been fought over by tyrannic warlords.

On Earth during the old west, Tal'Set faces off with his enemy, Captain Bruckner, and succeeds in cutting off his arm, but both of them are suddenly and inexplicably sucked into a wormhole. The wormhole opens in the jungle canopy of the Lost Land, and Tal'Set is nearly killed from the fall. He is found unconscious by the people of the River Village who call upon Tarkeen to heal him. Once healed, Tal'Set enters the jungle to fight reptilian humanoids known as the Sleg, aiming to keep them away from the Village. Tal'Set and River Village pilot Genn fly upon pterosaur-back to evict the Sleg from the jungle and destroy their airship.

Tal'Set reaches Tarkeen's sanctum and is told he must accept the mantle of Turok and release Tarkeen from a curse. When Tal'Set refuses, Tarkeen tells him that the Sleg had managed to reach the Village. This enrages Tal'Set which prompts him to cut through the mountains to reach the Sleg base to free the villagers and Wise Father from captivity.

Tal'Set proceeds to liberate the prisoners and destroy the base. Here, he learns of the existence of a human general, none other than Bruckner himself, who had ordered the attack on the village. It is also learned that the Sleg are planning to assault the human capitol, Galyana, but for their army to reach it, they must cross a giant chasm with only two known crossings. Tal'Set is sent through the thickly forested Shadowed Lands to destroy one of these crossings, an ancient bridge. The bridge is destroyed with Tal'Set upon it, but he is saved from falling by his pterosaur.

Tal'Set flies to the second crossing, the Suspended City, where his pterosaur is shot down. Tal'Set breaches the city and cleanses the street with his comrades, surviving the first wave of Sleg paratroopers entering the city. He breaches the Senate and saves the Senators, who tell him that the only way to stop the Slegs from cutting through the city is to destroy it. Tal'Set subsequently releases the tethers connecting the city to the Chasm walls. Tal'Set is given another pterosaur steed by the senators and escapes the falling city by flight.

The city is successfully destroyed, but the Sleg leader, Lord Tyrannus, has one more tactic to try. He unleashes the Juggernaut, an immense pair of cannons mounted upon a massive sauropod, with the aim to level Galyana. Tal'Set infiltrates and destroys the Juggernaut but before escaping is confronted by Tyrannus. The Sleg leader threatens to kill Tal'Set but is held off by Tarkeen. Tal'Set escapes again on his pterosaur and destroys one last wave of Sleg troops.

With the Sleg defeated, Tal'Set continues his hunt for Bruckner, quickly finding him aboard a Tyrannosaurus rex equipped with various weapons. Tal'Set kills the animal, which traps Bruckner beneath it as it falls. Tal'Set leaves the villain alive, stating "he does not deserve a warrior's death". As Tal'Set leaves, Bruckner is eaten alive by a pack of Compsognathus. In the aftermath, Lord Tyrannus furiously screams at his defeat and was not mentioned or seen again. Tal'Set tells Tarkeen that he accepts the mantle of Turok.

Development
The game had a marketing budget of $8 million.

Multiplayer
Turok: Evolution features four player split screen multiplayer for Gamecube and Xbox and two player for PS2. The game features at least 13 multiplayer maps, several of which contain dinosaur AI bots.

Game Boy Advance version
The Game Boy Advance version of the game takes the same concept from the past Game Boy iterations.  It is side scrolling and has 2D graphics.

Reception

Turok: Evolution received "mixed or average" reviews, according to review aggregator Metacritic.

The game's villain, Tobias Bruckner, lived on through Electronic Gaming Monthly'''s annual Tobias Bruckner Memorial Awards, which "honored" what they perceived to be the worst in video games, with categories specific to the games released in that year.

Cancelled sequel
After the release of Turok: Evolution'', Acclaim Studios Austin placed a small team in charge of creating a sequel. The project was not picked up, and the team moved on to other projects.

References

External links
 

2002 video games
Acclaim Entertainment games
Dinosaurs in video games
First-person shooters
Game Boy Advance games
GameCube games
Multiplayer and single-player video games
PlayStation 2 games
Video game prequels
Evolution
Video games based on Valiant Comics
Video games developed in France
Windows games
Xbox games
Video games developed in the United States
RFX Interactive games